This is the complete list of Asian Games medalists in Kabaddi from 1990 to 2018.

Men

Women

References

External links
Olympic Council of Asia

kabaddi

medalists